Meria may refer to:

People
 Meria Aires (born 1989), Bruneian singer-songwriter
 Meria people, also known as Volga Finns

Places
 Berești-Meria, Romania
 Meria, Hunedoara, Romania (ro)
 Meria, Haute-Corse, Corsica, France
 Meria, Ozurgeti Municipality, Georgia

Other
 MERIA, Middle East Review of International Affairs
 Meria Book, another name of the fictional character Shepherd Book in Firefly